Catherine Théot (born at Barenton (Normandy), France in 1716; died 1 September 1794) was a French visionary. Catherine believed she was destined to work for God. She gained notoriety when she was accused of being involved in a plot to overthrow the Republic, and the downfall of Maximilien Robespierre was attributed in part to her prophecies.

Life
Théot was born into a peasant family and from a young age suffered from hallucinations. She undertook a long course of religious asceticism in the lay convent of the Miramiones (fr) in Paris after which she was no longer of sound mind. In 1779 she announced herself to be the Virgin Mary, the new Eve, and the mother of God. After being held for a number of years in the Salpetrière hospital, she was set free in 1782. Not much is known about her activities for the following twelve years, but she made a home in the rue Contrescarpe and began to gather a small group of people who believed her prophecies. She believed  that she was destined to be the mother of the new Messiah and was hailed as the "Mother of God".

Theotist sect
Theot taught her followers that "God had permitted 1789" and that revolutionary laws had been made through God's inspiration. Disobedience to the convention, she taught, was disobedience to God.  These and similar beliefs were expounded in small gatherings of around fifteen women followers, in a room in a friend's house. Most of the women who followed her were of humble condition, but among them were also associates of the former Duchess of Bourbon, who consulted Catherine Theot for her prophecies and had sponsored the publication of a "Journal prophetique".

The Theotists saw the redeemer of mankind in Maximilien Robespierre, and preparations for his initiation were put in motion. The enemies of Robespierre, resenting his theocratic aims, used his relations with the Theotists as a way to get revenge. What became known as the "Catherine Théot affair" brought her notoriety in 1794. On 15 June Marc-Guillaume Alexis Vadier announced at the National Convention the plot to overthrow the Republic, accusing Théot and the people who met with her.

On 9 Thermidor Vadier claimed that a letter was found under Théot's mattress that proclaimed Robespierre to be John the Baptist of the new cult. Although the letter was likely fabricated, it was a way to condemn Robespierre for his connection with Théot and his Cult of the Supreme Being. The accusations lead to the arrest of Théot and some of her disciples.

The case was tried in the Revolutionary Tribunal, and figured in the proceedings of 9th of Thermidor. The accused were ultimately acquitted and set free. Catherine died in prison one month after Robespierre's execution.

References

Attribution:

Further reading 
 
 

1716 births
1794 deaths
18th-century French people
French people who died in prison custody
Prisoners who died in French detention
People killed in the French Revolution
People who died in prison custody during the French Revolution